Brady Reece Manek (born September 4, 1998) is an American professional basketball player for Tofaş of the Basketbol Süper Ligi (BSL). He played college basketball for the Oklahoma Sooners and the North Carolina Tar Heels.

Early life and high school career
Manek was born and raised in Edmond, Oklahoma and started playing basketball from a young age against older competition. He often played against future college teammate Trae Young while attending elementary school. His family moved to Harrah, Oklahoma, where he began playing varsity basketball for Harrah High School in his freshman season. Between his freshman and sophomore years, Manek greatly improved his dunking ability. He was named Little All-City Player of the Year by The Oklahoman in each of his final two seasons. As a senior, Manek averaged 24.3 points and 11.6 rebounds, leading Harrah to the state quarterfinals. Rated either a three-star and four-star recruit by several services, he committed to play college basketball for Oklahoma after his sophomore season of high school.

College career

Oklahoma

As a freshman at Oklahoma, Manek averaged 10.2 points and 5.2 rebounds per game in 32 appearances. He and Trae Young were the highest scoring freshman duo in the NCAA Division I. Manek recorded 59 three-pointers, the fourth-most by a freshman in school history. In his sophomore season, he made national headlines for his resemblance to Larry Bird. He averaged 12.2 points and 5.9 rebounds per game as a sophomore and was an All-Big 12 Honorable Mention selection. On January 18, 2020, Manek scored a career-high 31 points and seven three-pointers, while reaching 1,000 career points, in an 83–63 win over TCU. Manek scored 30 points on February 1, in an 82–69 victory over Oklahoma State. As a junior, he averaged 14.4 points, 6.2 rebounds and 1.2 blocks per game, earning Third Team All-Big 12 honors. In his senior season, Manek averaged 10.8 points and five rebounds per game. Following the season, he transferred to North Carolina.

North Carolina

After four years at Oklahoma, Manek transferred to North Carolina as a graduate student. He took advantage of the extra year of NCAA eligibility granted in response to the COVID-19 pandemic to play in Chapel Hill. After being used primarily as the sixth man for the first part of the season, Manek was inserted to the starting lineup following an injury to Dawson Garcia. Manek's elevation to the starting five coincided with a turnaround in the Tar Heels' fortunes, as the team was able to play their way to a tie for second place in the ACC regular season standings and the third seed in the conference's tournament. He scored 20 points in the Tar Heels' 94–81 victory in the regular-season finale against Duke. Following the regular season, Manek was named Honorable Mention All-ACC. In the first round of the NCAA tournament against Marquette, Manek scored a season-high 28 points, three shy of his career high. He scored 26 points in just 28 minutes of action against Baylor in the second round of the tournament. Manek was ejected from the game following a flagrant 2 foul on Baylor's Jeremy Sochan. At the time, the Tar Heels held a 25-point lead. Following the ejection, Baylor was able to come back and force overtime, but the Tar Heels held on and advanced to the Sweet 16, 93–86.

On April 1, 2022, Manek was named as the recipient of the Riley Wallace Player of the Year Award, given to the top transfer player in college basketball.

Professional career

Perth Wildcats (2022–2023)
After going undrafted in the 2022 NBA draft, Manek joined the Charlotte Hornets for the 2022 NBA Summer League. On August 1, 2022, he signed with the Perth Wildcats in Australia for the 2022–23 NBL season.

Tofaş (2023–present)
On February 24, 2023, Manek signed with Tofaş of the Basketbol Süper Ligi (BSL).

Career statistics

College

|-
| style="text-align:left;"| 2017–18 
| style="text-align:left;"| Oklahoma
|| 32 || 26 || 23.7 || .466 || .383 || .600 || 5.2 || .5 || .3 || .7 || 10.2
|-
| style="text-align:left;"| 2018–19
| style="text-align:left;"| Oklahoma 
|| 34 || 34 || 27.8 || .469 || .358 || .764 || 5.9 || .8 || .7 || .7 || 12.2
|-
| style="text-align:left;"| 2019–20
| style="text-align:left;"| Oklahoma
|| 31 || 31 || 30.5 || .453 || .380 || .779 || 6.2 || .9 || .5 || 1.2 || 14.4
|-
| style="text-align:left;"| 2020–21
| style="text-align:left;"| Oklahoma
|| 25 || 20 || 25.1 || .422 || .375 || .767 || 5.0 || .8 || .5 || .8 || 10.8
|- class="sortbottom"
|-
| style="text-align:left;"| 2021–22
| style="text-align:left;"| North Carolina
|| 39 || 27 || 30.4 || .493 || .403 || .697 || 6.1 || 1.8 || .6 || .7 || 15.1
|- class="sortbottom"
| style="text-align:center;" colspan="2"| Career
|| 161 || 138 || 27.7 || .465 || .382 || .733 || 5.7 || 1.0 || .5 || .8 || 12.7

Personal life
Manek's older brother, Kellen, was his basketball teammate at Harrah High School for three years and played for Oral Roberts and Southeastern Oklahoma State.

References

External links

NBL profile
North Carolina Tar Heels bio
Oklahoma Sooners bio

1998 births
Living people
American expatriate basketball people in Australia
American men's basketball players
Basketball players from Oklahoma
North Carolina Tar Heels men's basketball players
Oklahoma Sooners men's basketball players
Perth Wildcats players
Power forwards (basketball)
Small forwards
Sportspeople from Edmond, Oklahoma
Tofaş S.K. players